Tien (meaning Ten in Dutch), previously known as Talpa, was the name of a commercial television channel in the Netherlands. Tien opened on August 13, 2005 as Talpa, following a name dispute with SBS Broadcasting. SBS owned the trademark "TV10" and objected to the use of the word Tien. The owner of Tien, Dutch media mogul John de Mol, decided to rebrand the channel as Talpa, the Latin word for "mole", which is mol in Dutch. Subsequently Talpa became the name of De Mol's holding company.

In the first months Talpa shared its channel space with Nickelodeon. On December 16, 2006, Nickelodeon switched to The Box and Tien started broadcasting full days.

In December 2006, Talpa and SBS Broadcasting solved their dispute. Talpa was renamed as Tien.

In the summer of 2007, the assets of Talpa Media were sold to RTL Nederland, which meant the end of the Tien television channel. RTL Nederland used the vacated cable spot to launch a new television channel called RTL 8. Also included in the deal were the broadcasting rights for the Dutch football league and radio station Radio 538. Tien closed on August 17, 2007.

Programmes
Programmes included 'De Wedstrijden' (highlights of the Eredivisie football league), Big Brother and Expeditie Robinson. Tien is also noted for programming original Dutch drama, such as Gooische Vrouwen, Lotte, Van Speijk, Boks, Voetbalvrouwen and the daily comedy show Samen. Van Speijk, a highly publicized police series, attracted an average amount of 900,000 viewers weekly. Season one of "Gooische Vrouwen" attracted more than a million viewers each episode. Samen was the world's first daily comedy show.

Programming & ratings

From the beginning, the channel struggled with disappointing ratings. Expectations were high, because Talpa owned the rights to summaries of matches played in the Eredivisie, the Dutch top-flight football league. The live broadcasting rights were owned by Versatel, another De Mol venture.

In the beginning, football programme De Wedstrijden scored disappointing ratings. Although by far the most-watched programme on Talpa, De Wedstrijden failed to attract the audience that NOS programme Studio Sport used to have.  Dutch celebrities like Ivo Niehe and Henny Huisman also failed to attract their former audiences on Talpa. Niehe returned to his former employer TROS in January 2007. Niehe was also one of the most outspoken critics on the failure of the station in general. Huisman already left for EO after his unsuccessful stint with Talpa.

With Jack Spijkerman Talpa thought to have a guaranteed ratings hit, but his audience at Talpa was just one quarter of his former ratings at VARA. The football discussion program Spijkerman hosted with Humberto Tan was also unsuccessful and eventually axed.

Not all programmes flopped on Talpa. The controversial show Joling & Gordon over de Vloer (Joling and Gordon about the house, hosted by openly gay singers Gordon Heuckeroth and Gerard Joling) scored 1.2 million viewers. Other major hits were comedy drama series Gooische Vrouwen (Women from 't Gooi, 1.6 million viewers) and Voetbalvrouwen, the Dutch version of Footballers' Wives (1.4 million viewers). Expeditie Robinson, Miljoenenjacht and  Postcodeloterij Miljoenenjacht (1.5 million viewers) and 1 vs. 100 were also among the reasonably scoring shows, albeit with much smaller audiences than at the former broadcaster.

See also
 Television networks in the Netherlands

References

Further reading
 Versteeg, D. (2005). Talpa — de geboorte van een televisiezender. Naarden: Strengholt's Boeken. .

External links
 Official Site

Defunct television channels in the Netherlands
Television channels and stations established in 2005
Television channels and stations disestablished in 2007
Talpa Network